The 2018 Texas A&M–Kingsville Javelinas football team represented Texas A&M University–Kingsville in the 2018 NCAA Division II football season. They were led by fourth-year head coach Daren Wilkinson. The Javelinas played their home games at Javelina Stadium and were members of the Lone Star Conference.

Schedule
Texas A&M–Kingsville announced its 2018 football schedule on January 9, 2018 with an update on April 30, 2018 and a final release on June 5, 2018. The schedule consists of eleven games including seven home and four away games in the regular season. The Javelinas will host LSC foes Eastern New Mexico, Midwestern State, Western New Mexico and Texas-Permian Basin and will travel to Texas A&M-Commerce, Angelo State, Tarleton State and West Texas A&M.

The Javelinas will host three non-conference games against NAIA Texas Wesleyan from the Sooner Athletic Conference, Western Oregon from the Great Northwest Athletic Conference (GNAC) and New Mexico Highlands from the Rocky Mountain Athletic Conference (RMAC).

References

Texas AandM-Kingsville
Texas A&M–Kingsville Javelinas football seasons
Texas AandM-Kingsville Football